By the early 19th century, several companies established strings of fur trading posts and forts across North America.

Canada

Alberta

Fort Assiniboine
Beaver Lake Cree Nation
Buckingham House
Fort Chipewyan
Fort Dunvegan
Fort Edmonton
Fort Calgary
Fort Walsh
Fort de l'Isle
Jasper House
Fort McMurray
Rocky Mountain House
Fort Vilion
Fort Victo

British Columbia

Alexandria
Barkerville
Fort Babine
Fort Berens
Fort Chilcotin
Fort Connelly
Fort Fraser
Fort Halkett
Henry's House
Fort Kluskus
Kootanae House
Fort Langley
Lower Post
Fort McDame
Fort McLoughlin
Fort Nelson
Fort Resolution
Fort St. James
Fort St. John
Fort Simpson
Trout Lake Fort
Fort Victoria
Fort Ware
Fort Yale

Manitoba

Fort Alexander
Fort Bourbon
Brandon House
Brunswick House First Nation
Fort Dauphin
Fort Douglas
Fort Ellice
Fort Garry
Lower Fort Garry
Fort Gibraltar
Fort La Reine
Fort Maurepas
Fort Paskoya
Prince of Wales Fort
Fort Rouge
York Factory

Winnipeg

Fort Garry
Fort Gibraltar
Fort Hailey

Newfoundland and Labrador

Eyelich Trading Post

Northwest Territories

Aklavik
Baillie Island
Fort Collinson
Fort Franklin
Fort Good Hope
Fort Liard
Fort MacLeod
Fort McKay
Fort McPherson
Fort Providence
Old Fort Providence
Fort Simpson
Fort Smith

Nova Scotia

Fortress of Louisbourg

Nunavut

Amadjuak
Baker Lake
Bathurst Inlet
Port Burwell
Gjoa Haven
Killiniq
Padlei
Fort Ross

Ontario

Allanwater Bridge railway station
Asp House
Asubpeeschoseewagong First Nation
Attawapiskat First Nation
Flying Post
Fort Albany
Fort Frances
Fort Frontenac
Fort Kaministiquia
Fort Lac la Pluie
Fort Matachewan
Fort Rouillé
Fort Saint Pierre
Fort Severn First Nation
Fort Toronto
Fort William, Ontario
Frederick House Post
Henley House
Lake Abitibi
Magasin Royal
Moose Factory
Terryberry Trading Post, Barton twp

Ottawa

Fort D. Smith

Quebec

Vieux-Poste
Fort-Coulonge
Nabisipi Trading Post
Fort Témiscamingue
Rupert House
Whapmagoostui

(Maniwaki in the Outaouais region of Quebec, Canada. HBC established fur trading post)
(17th century fur trade building located in Lachine, Montreal, Quebec, Canada.)
(Nipising 1874 Hudson's Bay Company trading post)
Fort George

Saskatchewan

Battleford
Beauval
Fort Carlton
Fort de la Corne
Cumberland House
Fort Espérance
Île-à-la-Crosse
Fort Pelly
Fort Pitt
Fort Qu'Appelle

Yukon

Fort Selkirk
Teslin Post

United States

Alabama

Massacre Isle

Arkansas

Little Rock
Arkansas Post

Alaska

Fort Stikine
Fort Yukon

Arizona

Hubbell Trading Post

California

Fort Ross
Yerba Buena

Colorado

Bent's Fort on the Santa Fe Trail, near present day La Junta, Colorado
Fort Uncompaghre, Alta California
Fort Vasquez

Connecticut

Fort Huys de Goede Hoop, New Netherland

Idaho

Fort Boise
Fort Hall, Oregon Country
Kullyspell House

Indiana

Fort Vincennes

Michigan

Fort de Buade
Fort Detroit
Fort Mackinac
Fort Michilimackinac
Fort St. Joseph
Sault Ste. Marie

Minnesota

Fort Duquesne
Fort Renville
Fort St. Charles
Fort Snelling Northfield
Grand Portage
Snake River Fur Post

Missouri

Fort Carondelet
Fort Osage

Montana

Saleesh House
Fort Union - located partially in North Dakota

Nebraska

Fort Atkinson
Cabanne's Trading Post, Nebraska Territory
Fontenelle's Post, Nebraska Territory
Fort Lisa, Nebraska Territory

New York

Fort Nassau, New Netherland (present-day Albany)
New Amsterdam, New Netherland
Fort Orange, New Netherland (present-day Albany)
 Fort Ontario (present-day Oswego, New York)

North Dakota

Fort Berthold
Fort Clark
Grand Forks
Fort Lisa, Dakota Territory
Fort Union - located partially in Montana

Oregon

Fort Astoria
Fort Umpqua, Oregon Country
Fort William, Oregon Country

Pennsylvania

Fort Duquesne
Fort de la Rivière au Bœuf

South Dakota

Hazen Mooers' Post
Lac Traverse Post
Lake Traverse Post
Sieche Hollow Post
Spencer Fur Post
Vermillion Post

Utah

Fort Buenaventura
Fort Robidoux, Alta California

Washington

Fort Vancouver, Oregon Territory
Fort Colville
Fort Nez Percés
Fort Nisqually
Fort Okanogan
Spokane
Spokane House

Wyoming

Fort Bonneville
Fort Bridger, Nebraska Territory

See also
 List of Hudson's Bay Company trading posts

Fur trade
Lists of buildings and structures by type
Lists of forts
North America-related lists